UDSL may mean:
University of Dayton School of Law
Uni-DSL